Idim Afia (White River) is a village in Eket local government area of Akwa Ibom State.

The people of Idim Afia primarily engage in fishing and other riverine activities. They speak Ekid.

References 

Villages in Akwa Ibom